Kühn is a surname of German origin, derived from the Old German name Conrad. It may refer to one of the following people:

 Anke Kühne née Kühn (b. 1981), German hockey player
 Axel Kühn (b. 1967), German bobsledder
 Christian Kühn (b. 1979), German politician
 Daniela Kühn (b. 1973), German mathematician
 Dieter Kühn (b. 1956), German footballer
 Enrico Kühn (b. 1977), German bobsledder
 Friedrich Kühn (general) (1889–1944), German army armor general
 Gabriele Kühn (b. 1957), German rower
 Gerd Kühn (b. 1968), German footballer
 Heinrich Kühn (1866–1944), Austrian Photographer
 Heinz Kühn (1912–1992), German politician
 Joachim Kühn (b. 1944), German jazz pianist
 Jörg Kühn (1940–1964), Swiss artist
 Julius Kühn (1825–1910), German academic and agronomist
 Michael Kühn (b. 1963), German footballer
 Othmar Kühn (1892–1969), Austrian paleontologist and geologist
 Rolf Kühn (1929–2022), German jazz clarinetist and saxophonist
 Sophie von Kühn (1782–1797), fiancée of the German Romantic poet and philosopher Novalis
 Stephan Kühn (born 1979), German politician
 Susanne Kühn (born 1969), German artist
 Volkmar Kühn (born 1942), German artist
 Wolfram Kühn (b. 1952), German Navy Vice Admiral

See also 
 Kuhn
 Kühne
Surnames from given names

References

German-language surnames